The Rat River is a tributary of the Burntwood River in Manitoba, Canada.

The Rat River forms the north–south part of the Churchill River Diversion.

See also
Rat River (Red River of the North), a tributary of the Red River of the North
List of rivers of Manitoba

References

Rivers of Manitoba
Tributaries of Hudson Bay